Jürgen Honig (born 16 April 1940) is a German water polo player. He competed in the men's tournament at the 1960 Summer Olympics.

References

1940 births
Living people
German male water polo players
Olympic water polo players of the United Team of Germany
Water polo players at the 1960 Summer Olympics
Sportspeople from Duisburg